Piyain River a trans-boundary river of India and Bangladesh. It is a tributary of the Surma river, which is originates from the Umngot of Meghalaya . The river enters Bangladesh through Sylhet district.

The origin and flow 
The length of the river is 145 km. Piyain river has emerged from the river om or Umagat river or Assam.

Gallery

References

External links

 Piyain River at Banglapedia

International rivers of Asia
Rivers of India
Rivers of Meghalaya
Rivers of Bangladesh
Rivers of Sylhet Division